The 2003 DFB-Ligapokal Final decided the winner of the 2003 DFB-Ligapokal, the 7th edition of the reiterated DFB-Ligapokal, a knockout football cup competition.

The match was played on 28 July 2003 at the Bruchwegstadion in Mainz. Hamburger SV won the match 4–2 against Borussia Dortmund for their 1st title of the reiterated competition, and 2nd title including the 1972–73 edition.

Teams

Route to the final
The DFB-Ligapokal is a six team single-elimination knockout cup competition. There are a total of two rounds leading up to the final. Four teams enter the preliminary round, with the two winners advancing to the semi-finals, where they will be joined by two additional clubs who were given a bye. For all matches, the winner after 90 minutes advances. If still tied, extra time, and if necessary penalties are used to determine the winner.

Match

Details

References

2003
Borussia Dortmund matches
Hamburger SV matches
2003–04 in German football cups